The 2018 Championships of the Small States of Europe was the second edition of the biennial competition in outdoor track and field organised by the Athletic Association of Small States of Europe (AASE). It was held on 9 June 2018 at the Sportplatz Rheinwiese in Schaan, Liechtenstein. A total of 22 events were contested by around 250 athletes from 18 nations.

Medal summary

Men

Women

Medal table

References

 Championships of the Small States of Europe. Tilastopaja (2020-05-23). Retrieved 2020-11-21.
 Full results . CSSE2018.li. Retrieved 2020-11-21.
Results at World Athletics

Championships of the Small States of Europe
Small States of Europe
Athletics in Liechtenstein
International sports competitions hosted by Liechtenstein
Small States of Europe